David Maina (born 1 January 1959) is a Kenyan weightlifter. He competed in the men's middleweight event at the 1988 Summer Olympics.

References

External links
 

1959 births
Living people
Kenyan male weightlifters
Olympic weightlifters of Kenya
Weightlifters at the 1988 Summer Olympics
Place of birth missing (living people)